Laura Daners Chao (1 February 1967 – 17 September 2010) was an Uruguayan television presenter and journalist.

Daners was a very successful synchronized swimmer and competed for Uruguay at the 1987 Pan American Games in Indianapolis. She started her journalistic career at Canal 5. She then became known to a wider public as the presenter of Telemundo 12 alongside Néber Araújo. Daners had multiple sclerosis, which ultimately led to death. She was the mother of two children and was buried in the Cementerio del Buceo, Montevideo.

References 

1967 births
2010 deaths
Uruguayan television presenters
Uruguayan television journalists
Uruguayan female swimmers
Deaths from multiple sclerosis
Neurological disease deaths in Uruguay
Women television journalists
Uruguayan women television presenters
Burials at Cementerio del Buceo, Montevideo
Synchronized swimmers at the 1987 Pan American Games
Pan American Games competitors for Uruguay